Raymond Smee (born 25 October 1930) is an Australian water polo player. He competed at the 1952 Summer Olympics and the 1956 Summer Olympics. In 2010, he was inducted into the Water Polo Australia Hall of Fame.

References

External links
 

1930 births
Living people
Australian male water polo players
Olympic water polo players of Australia
Water polo players at the 1952 Summer Olympics
Water polo players at the 1956 Summer Olympics
Place of birth missing (living people)